was a Japanese daimyō of the Edo period, who ruled the Hiroshima Domain.

Two of his consorts were daughters of the court noble and regent Kujō Michifusa. His childhood name was Iwamatsu.

Family
 Father: Asano Mitsuakira
 Mother: Maeda Manhime (1618–1700), daughter of Maeda Toshitsune, 2nd Daimyo of Kaga Domain, and Tokugawa Tamahime (daughter of the 2nd shōgun Tokugawa Hidetada and Asai Oeyo)
 Wives:
 Kujō Aiko (d. 1659), second daughter of the regent Kujō Michifusa (son of the regent Kujō Yukiie and Toyotomi Sadako), and Matsudaira Tsuruhime (daughter of Matsudaira Tadanao, 2nd Daimyo of Fukui Domain and Tokugawa Katsuhime, daughter of the 2nd shōgun Tokugawa Hidetada and Asai Oeyo))
 Kujō Yasuko (d. 1679), fifth daughter of Kujō Michifusa and Matsudaira Tsuruhime
 Children:
 Asano Tsunanaga by Aiko
 Asano Nagazumi (1671–1718) by Yasuko
 daughter married Honda Tadatsune of Koriyama Domain

References
 "World Nobility" (4 November 2007)

Daimyo
1637 births
1673 deaths
Asano clan